Ali Sina may refer to:

People
 Abu Ali Sina (980–1037), Persian philosopher, physician, scientist and poet.
 Ali Sina (activist), pseudonym of the founder of several anti-Islam and anti-Muslim websites.
 Ali Sina Rabbani, an Iranian football midfielder.

Other
 Bu-Ali Sina University, a university in Hamedan, Iran.
 Alisina, a Cambrian genus of Obolellid brachiopod.